Margolisia is a genus of trematodes in the family Opecoelidae. It consists of one species, Margolisia vidalensis Bray, 1987.

References

Opecoelidae
Plagiorchiida genera
Monotypic protostome genera